This is a list of assets owned by PepsiCo.

Trademarks 
Agousha (Russia)
Alvalle (Spain)
AMP Energy
Aquafina
Aquafina Flavorsplash
Aunt Jemima/Pearl Milling Company
Baconzitos (Brazil)
Cap'n Crunch
Cheetos
Chester's
Chipsy (Egypt, Serbia)
Chudo
Cracker Jack
Crunchy
Diet Mountain Dew
Diet Mug
Diet Pepsi
Diet 7UP (only outside of the United States)
Diet Sierra Mist
Domik v Derevne (Russia)
Doritos 
Duyvis (Netherlands)
Elma Chips (Brazil)
Emperador (Mexico)
Evervess (Russia)
Fandangos (Brazil)
Frito-Lay
Fritos
Fruktoviy Sad (Russia)
Frustyle (Russia)
G2
Gatorade
Gatorade Zero
Grandma's
Imunele (Russia)
Izze
Ivi (Albania, Greece, Cyprus, Serbia, Kosovo)
Kas
KhrusTeam (Russia)
Kurkure (Bangladesh, India, Pakistan)
Lay's
Life
Lifewater
Lubimy (Russia)
Manzanita Sol
Marias Gamesa
Matutano (Spain, Portugal)
Marbo (Serbia)
Mirinda
Miss Vickie's
Mountain Dew
Mountain Dew Code Red
Mountain Dew Game Fuel
Mountain Dew Kickstart
Mug
Munchies
Naked
Near East
O.N.E.
Paso de los Toros (Uruguay)
Pasta Roni
Pepsi
Pepsi Max
Pepsi Next
Pepsi Zero Sugar
Pioneer Foods
Propel
Quaker
Quaker Chewy
Rice-A-Roni 
Rold Gold
Rosquinhas Mabel (Brazil)
Ruffles
Russkiy Dar (Russia)
Sabritas
Sakata (Australia)
Saladitas
Sandora (Ukraine)
Santitas
7UP (only outside of the United States)
7UP Free (only outside of the United States)
Sierra Mist
Simba (Southern Africa)
Smartfood
Smith's (Australia)
Snack a Jacks
SoBe
SoBe Lifewater
SoBe V Water
Sonric’s
Stacy’s
Star
Starry
Stiksy (Brazil)
Sting
SunChips
Tonus
Tostitos
Trop 50
Tropicana
Tropicana Farmstand
Tropicana Pure Premium
Tropicana Twister
Twisties (Oceania Region)
Vesely Molochnik
Walkers (United Kingdom)
Ya (Russia)
Yedigün (Turkey)

Licensed and joint partnership trademarks 
 Dole (certain markets)
 Lipton
 Ocean Spray (certain markets)
 Sabra
 Starbucks
 Yum! Brands
 Papa John's

Products 
Breakfast Bars
Quaker Chewy Granola Bars
Quaker Chewy Granola Cocoa Bars
Quaker Chewy Smashbars
Quaker Dipps Granola Bars
Quaker Oatmeal to Go Bars
Quaker Stila Bars
Quaker Yogurt Granola Bars
Coffee Drinks
Seattle's Best Coffee
Starbucks DoubleShot
Starbucks Frappucino
Starbucks Iced Coffee
Energy Drinks
AMP Energy
 Mountain Dew Energy
Rockstar Energy Drink
Starbucks Refreshers
SoBe
Cereal
Cap'n Crunch Cereal
King Vitaman Cereal
Kretschmer Toasted Wheat Germ
Quaker Life Cereal
Mother's Ready-to-Eat & Hot Cereals
Quaker Essentials
Quaker Grits
Quaker Instant Oatmeal
Quaker Natural Granola Cereal
Quaker Old Fashioned Oats
Quaker Oh!s Cereal
Quaker Puffed Rice
Quaker Shredded Wheat Cereal
Quaker Oatmeal Squares Cereal
Quisp Cereal
Other
AMP Energy Gum
Aunt Jemima Mixes & Syrups (now Pearl Milling)
Quaker Baking Mixes
Sabra Hummus
Tropicana
Rice Snacks
Quaker Large Rice Cakes
Quaker Mini Delights
Quaker Quakes
Quaker Tortillaz
Side Dishes
Near East Side Dishes
Pasta Roni Side Dishes
Rice-A-Roni Side Dishes
Snacks
Baked! Cheetos Snacks
Baked! Doritos Tortilla Chips
Baked! Lay's Potato Crisps
Baked! Ruffles Potato Chips
Baked! Tostitos Tortilla Chips
Baken-Ets Chicharrones
Cheetos Cheese Flavored Snacks
Chester's Flavored Fries
Chester's Popcorn
Cracker Jack Candy Coated Popcorn
Doritos Tortilla Chips
El Isleno Plaintain Chips
Frito-Lay, Fritos, Lay's, and Tostitos Dips & Salsas
Frito-Lay Nuts & Seeds
Fritos Corn Chips
Funyuns Onion Flavored Rings
Gamesa Cookies and Wafers
Grandma's Cookies
Hickory Sticks
Hostess Potato Chips
Lay's Kettle Cooked Potato Chips
Lay's Kurkure
Lay's Potato Chips
Lay's Stax Potato Crisps
Lay's Wavy Potato Chips
Maui Style Potato Chips
Miss Vickie's Potato Chips
Munchies Snack Crackers
Munchies Snack Mix
Munchos Potato Crisps
Natural Cheetos
Natural Lay's
Natural Ruffles
Natural Tostitos
Nut Harvest Nuts
Rold Gold Pretzels
Ruffles Potato Chips
Sabritones Puffed Wheat Snacks
Santitas Tortille Chips
Smartfood Popcorn
Smartfood Popcorn Clusters
Spitz Seeds
Tesco
Stacy's Pita
Bagel Chips
SunChips Multigrain Snacks
Tasali Snack Foods - in Saudi Arabia
Tostito's Artisan Recipes Tortilla Chips
Tostito's Tortilla Chips
Soft Drinks (original Pepsi brands)
Diet Mountain Dew
Mountain Dew
Mountain Dew Throwback
Mist Twst
Mist Twst Cherry
Mist Twst Cranberry
Diet Mist Twst
Diet Mist Twst Cranberry
Crush
Pepsi
Pepsi Atom
Diet Pepsi
Pepsi Zero Sugar
Pepsi Twist
Pepsi Blue
Pepsi Pink
Pepsi Gold
Pepsi Green
Pepsi Black
Pepsi White
Pepsi Salty Watermelon
Pepsi Azuki
Pepsi Ice Cucumber
Pepsi Shiso
Pepsi Mont Blanc
Pepsi Edge
Pepsi One
Pepsi Next
Pepsi Wild Cherry
Diet Wild Cherry Pepsi
Caffeine Free Pepsi
Diet Caffeine Free Pepsi
Diet Pepsi Lime
Caffeine Free Mountain Dew
Caffeine Free Diet Mountain Dew
Mountain Dew Livewire
Mountain Dew Code Red
Diet Mountain Dew Code Red
Lipton Brisk Lemon
Lipton Brisk Sweet Tea
Mountain Dew Voltage
Mountain Dew White Out
Diet Lipton Brisk WL
Lipton Brisk Fruit Punch
Lipton Brisk Lemonade
Pepsi Throwback
Mug
Diet Mug
Mirinda
Tropicana Products
Bubly sparkling water
Sports Nutrition
Gatorade G Series Prime 01
Gatorade Thirst Quencher - G Series Perform 02
Gatorade G Series Recover 03
Gatorade G2
Gatorade Natural 
Gatorade G2 Natural 
Gatorade G Series FIT Prime 01 Pre-Workout Fuel
Gatorade G Series FIT Perform 02 Workout Hydration 
Gatorade G Series FIT Recover 03 Post-Workout Recovery
Gatorade G Series PRO 01 Nutrition Shake
Gatorade G Series PRO 01 Nutrition Bar
Gatorade G Series PRO 01 Carbohydrate Energy Formula 
Gatorade G Series PRO 02 Endurance Formula 
Gatorade G Series PRO 02 Perform Gatorlytes
Gatorade G Series PRO 03 Protein Recovery Shake
Gatorade G Series PRO Prime + 
Gatorade G Series PRO Recover +
Bottled Water 
Aquafina
Aquafina FlavorSplash
Driftwell, a water with added  L-theanine to encourage sleep.
Propel Zero
SoBe Lifewater

See also
PepsiCo

References

External links
https://web.archive.org/web/20101221163450/http://pepsico.com/Brands/Pepsi_Cola-Brands.html

PepsiCo
PepsiCo